Thomas Hewitt (born 8 March 1950) is an Irish sports shooter. He competed in the mixed trap event at the 1980 Summer Olympics.

References

External links
 

1950 births
Living people
Irish male sport shooters
Olympic shooters of Ireland
Shooters at the 1980 Summer Olympics
Place of birth missing (living people)
Commonwealth Games medallists in shooting
Commonwealth Games gold medallists for Northern Ireland
Commonwealth Games silver medallists for Northern Ireland
Male sport shooters from Northern Ireland
Shooters at the 1986 Commonwealth Games
Shooters at the 1994 Commonwealth Games
20th-century Irish people
Medallists at the 1986 Commonwealth Games
Medallists at the 1994 Commonwealth Games